The 2018 Newfoundland and Labrador Men's Curling Championship (also known as the Tankard), the men's provincial curling championship for Newfoundland and Labrador, was held from January 29 to February 4 at the St. John's Curling Club in St. John's, Newfoundland and Labrador. The winning Greg Smith team represented Newfoundland and Labrador at the 2018 Tim Hortons Brier at the Brandt Centre in Regina.

It was the first time since 2006 that the event was not won by Brad Gushue, as his team represented Team Canada at the 2018 Brier as defending champions.

Teams
Teams are as follows:

Round-robin standings
Final round-robin standings

Round-robin results

January 29
Draw 1
Symonds 8-6 C. Thomas
Harvey 4-10 O'Driscoll
Smith 11-3 D. Thomas
Lockyer 1-8 Boland

January 30
Draw 2
Harvey 10-3 Lockyer
Skanes 4-6 Smith
Boland 7-4 C. Thomas
O'Driscoll 10-4 D. Thomas

Draw 3
Boland 8-4 O'Driscoll
Lockyer 2-7 Symonds
Harvey 4-5 Skanes
Smith 9-7 C. Thomas

January 31
Draw 4
Skanes 3-7 C. Thomas
Boland 10-2 D. Thomas
Lockyer 8-5 O'Driscoll
Harvey 9-10 Symonds

Draw 5
Harvey 11-4 D. Thomas
O'Driscoll 8-7 C. Thomas
Smith 8-6 Symonds
Lockyer 6-13 Skanes

February 1
Draw 6
O'Driscoll 3-9 Smith
Skanes 4-7 Symonds
Boland 7-8 Harvey
C. Thomas 9-3 D. Thomas

Draw 7
Boland 7-5 Symonds
Lockyer 12-8 D. Thomas
O'Driscoll 10-7 Skanes
Harvey 10-11 Smith

February 2
Draw 8
Skanes 7-6 D. Thomas
Boland 8-9 Smith
Lockyer 3-12 C. Thomas
O'Driscoll 3-5 Symonds

Draw 9
Lockyer 2-10 Smith
Harvey 6-4 C. Thomas
Symonds 7-5 D. Thomas
Boland 6-4 Skanes

Playoffs
Due to finishing the round robin undefeated, Smith must be defeated twice.

Semifinal

Final

Final 2

References

External links
Scores

2018 Tim Hortons Brier
Tankard, 2018
Tankard, 2018
Tankard, 2018
January 2018 sports events in Canada
February 2018 sports events in Canada